Tootie may refer to:

People
 Albert Heath (born 1935), American jazz drummer
 Allison Montana (1922–2005), New Orleans Mardi Gras icon
 Tootie Perry (1896–1946), American college football player
 Tootie Robbins (born 1958), American former National Football League player
 Tootie Smith (born 1957), American politician

Fictional characters
Tootie Ramsey, played by Kim Fields on the sitcom The Facts of Life
Tootie (The Fairly OddParents), a major character on the animated TV series The Fairly OddParents
"Tootie" Smith, in the 1944 MGM musical Meet Me in St. Louis, played by child actress Margaret O'Brien

Other uses
"Tootie", a 1996 song by Hootie & the Blowfish from Fairweather Johnson

See also
 Tooty, a character in the video game Banjo-Kazooie
 Toodee, a character in the children's TV series Yo Gabba Gabba!

Lists of people by nickname